Carpasio (Ligurian: Carpaxe) is a former comune (municipality) in the Province of Imperia in the Italian region Liguria, located about  southwest of Genoa and about  northwest of Imperia. At the beginning of 2018 Caprasio was unified with Montalto Ligure in the new comune of Montalto Carpasio.

Carpasio bordered the following municipalities: Borgomaro, Molini di Triora, Montalto Ligure, Prelà, and Rezzo.

Demographic evolution

Twin towns — sister cities
Carpasio is twinned with:

  Saorge, France (2006)

References

Frazioni of the Province of Imperia
Former municipalities of the Province of Imperia